In Indian cuisine, a rice and three restaurant is one where the customer picks three curries from a selection, which are served over rice. The concept is derived from the thali style of service.

The concept was claimed to have been created by the This and That restaurant in Bolton, Greater Manchester during the 1980s.

See also

List of restaurant terminology
Meat and three

References

Culture in Greater Manchester
English cuisine
Food combinations
Restaurant terminology